The Everlasting Blink is the second album from the electronica chillout duo Bent.

Track listing

Notes
 After "Thick Ear" ends, there is about nine minutes of silence, then three hidden bonus tracks: "12 Bar Fire Blues", "Wendy" and "Day-Care Partyline".
 "Beautiful Otherness" contains vocals by Jon Marsh of The Beloved
 "So Long Without You" contains elements of "Hurt" and "But I Do" by Billie Jo Spears.

Personnel
Simon Mills
Neil Tolliday

References

Bent (band) albums
2003 albums